Plestiodon inexpectatus, the southeastern five-lined skink is a common skink in the southeastern United States.

Etymology
The specific name, inexpectatus ("the unexpected"), is possibly a reference to the unexpected discovery of this species in 1932, almost 175 years after Linnaeus described Plestiodon fasciatus, commonly known as the American five-lined skink.

Description
As their common name suggests, southeastern five-lined skinks have five characteristic narrow stripes along their bodies that become lighter with age. The middle stripe tends to be narrower than the others, and the dark areas between stripes are black in young skinks but become brown with age. A similar lizard, the common five-lined skink (Plestiodon fasciatus), is slightly smaller than the southeastern five-lined skink and has broader stripes. However, it is difficult to discriminate between these two species on the basis of physical appearance.

Young southeastern five-lined skinks have a bright blue or purplish tail, especially towards the tip. Also, stripes become a bright reddish orange towards the head. Juvenile coloration may persist into adulthood, giving the head of the animal an altogether orange-brown appearance.

Habitat
Southeastern five-lined skinks are common inhabitants of wooded areas of the southeastern United States. They are commonly found on small islands off the southeastern coast even in the absence of fresh water and vegetation.

Behavior
They are diurnal ground-dwelling animals.

Diet
Like other skinks of the genus Plestiodon, they feed primarily on insects, preferring larger prey such as grasshoppers.

In captivity
This skink species is easy to maintain in captivity. It has the same requirements as the common five-lined skink, although it can tolerate dryer conditions.

Reproduction
Southeastern five-lined skinks are oviparous; the clutch size varies from 6 to 12, with the number of eggs diminishing with higher latitudes. The female broods the eggs and protects them from predators, including other skinks. The hatchlings appear about one month after the eggs have been laid near the beginning of summer.

References

Further reading
Behler, J.L., and F.W. King. 1979. The Audubon Society Field Guide to North American Reptiles and Amphibians. Knopf. New York. 743 pp. . (Eumeces inexpectatus, pp. 572–573 + Plates 426, 444.)
Conant, R. 1975. A Field Guide to Reptiles and Amphibians of Eastern and Central North America, Second Edition. Houghton Mifflin. Boston. xviii + 429 pp.  (hardcover),  (paperback). (Eumeces inexpectatus, pp. 124–125 + Plate 19 + Map 77.)
Smith, H.M., and E.D. Brodie Jr. 1982. Reptiles of North America: A Guide to Field Identification. Golden Press. New York. 240 pp. . (Eumeces inexpectatus, pp. 74–75.)
Taylor, E.H. 1932. Eumeces inexpectatus: A New American Lizard of the Family Scincidae. Univ. Kansas Sci. Bull. 20 (13): 251-261.

External links

inexpectatus
Reptiles described in 1932
Taxa named by Edward Harrison Taylor